The Tampa Marauders are an American soccer club from Tampa, Florida. The club currently plays in the Champions Soccer League USA. Their home games are played in downtown Tampa at the Naimoli Family Athletic and Intramural Complex, on the campus of the University of Tampa.

History
The Tampa Marauders FC joined the National Premier Soccer League (NPSL) for the 2012 season. In 2015 the Marauders joined the new Champions Soccer League as a founding member. On January 5, 2017, the Marauders announced that former midfielder Saif Alsafeer would take over as manager.

Year-by-year

Stadium
Naimoli Family Athletic and Intramural Complex

Club culture

Supporters
Cigar City Corsairs is the main independent supporter group for the Tampa Marauders, established in 2013. The group is known for wearing black, red, and white scarfs and waving the Marauder flags, chanting "Defend our port!" The group is one of the most dedicated fans in the Tampa Bay Area. The group has partnered with the Ralph's Mob, another truly dedicated fan based for the Tampa Bay Rowdies. The partnership has establish both groups as the largest soccer fan base in the Tampa area.

Rivalries
The Marauders' main rivalry is with the Cape Coral Hurricanes. The rivalry began in 2013 in a series contested for the Gulf Coast Cup.

Players
Current roster

as of April 6, 2014

Management

Front Office
  Kevin Hickling – President
  Maria Silva – Vice President
  Jim Pinciotti – Vice President

Coaches
  Saif Alsafeer – Head Coach
  Alex Delgado – Assistant Coach

Head Coaching History
  Maurice Loregnard (2013–2014)

Achievements
Gulf Coast Cup
Winners (2): 2013, 2014

References

External links
Official site

Soccer clubs in Florida
Soccer clubs in Tampa, Florida
Association football clubs established in 2012
2012 establishments in Florida